The Forbidden is a Ugandan drama film produced by Claire Nampala and directed by Kizito Samuel Saviour.

It premiered at Bat Valley Theatre on 3 February 2018 and was immediately nominated for the Best Feature Film award at the Amakaula International Film Festival and later won the award, becoming the first Ugandan film to win the award since the launch of the awards. The film went ahead to be nominated in more than twenty categories in more than five awarding bodies including Zulu African Film Academy Awards (ZAFAA), Golden Movie Awards, Zanzibar International Film Festival, Africa Magic Viewers' Choice Awards.

Plot
Dian is on a quest to find her long lost father. The quest leads her into darkest moments and the loss of her mother even before she can find her father.

Awards & Nominations

References

External links
 
 Ugandan Films scoop Awards at The African Film Festival

2018 films
English-language Ugandan films
Films set in Uganda
Films shot in Uganda
2010s English-language films